To Die in Italbar (1973) is a science fiction novel by American writer Roger Zelazny.  To Die in Italbar follows Mr. H, a man who needs only to touch someone to heal or hurt them, during a deadly galactic pandemic.

The novel contains a cameo by Francis Sandow, the protagonist of Isle of the Dead, but it is not a sequel. Zelazny originally wrote this book hastily to fulfill a contract when he became a full-time writer in May 1969, and the publisher declined to publish it then. He revisited the manuscript in 1972 and added about 25% new material, including the cameo of Sandow to "jazz up" the novel. It was finally released in 1973. He bemoaned the book ever after, calling it his "worst novel" and noting, “If I could kill off one book it would be To Die in Italbar. I wrote that in a hurry to make some money after I quit my job.”

Plot
Heidel von Hymack, known to all as "H", is a man with the power to cure people of incurable diseases.  He travels from world to world healing people by touching them.  However his healing powers have a dark side: after a while they reverse and he becomes a spreader of deadly diseases.  Avoiding contact with others is almost impossible because of his celebrity, so his most dedicated followers tend to die horribly.  He does not know why he has this power, though he dreams of a mysterious "Lady" who rules his life.  In fact he has been accidentally joined to a deity of the Pei'an religion, a goddess of disease and healing whose changing moods determine whether he saves or kills.  The only other human so joined is Francis Sandow, a man of incalculable wealth who builds planets.  Sandow was introduced in the novel Isle of the Dead.  To escape his fate, "H" must go with Sandow and others to the devastated remains of the Earth, destroyed in a recent war, where Sandow engages in a duel of powers to drive out the goddess.

Elsewhere, Malacar Miles is the last holdout on Earth, the last bastion of the old regime and an obstacle to Sandow and other world builders who want to make the planet habitable again.  Part of Sandow's mission is to remove the obstacle Malacar presents.

Reception
Sidney Coleman, writing in F&SF, found the novel greatly inferior to Zelazny's previous novels, although he acknowledged that if evaluated simply as "preposterous adventure," it was a well-written "superior specimen" marked by "fast action," "strong emotion", "colorful characters," and its author's "fertile imagination."

References

Sources

1973 American novels
Novels by Roger Zelazny
1973 science fiction novels
American science fiction novels
Doubleday (publisher) books